Nenad Nikolić (Serbian Cyrillic: Ненад Николић, 20 August 1961 – 30 April 1999) was a left-back Serbian footballer who spent most of his career with FK Čukarički.

He was killed, at the age of 37, on 30 April 1999 during the NATO bombing of Yugoslavia.

Early life
Nenad was born in Lipljan, PR Serbia, FPR Yugoslavia. His father's name was Ljubomir. As a young child he moved to Zemun with his family, while a year later he moved to, Petlovo Brdo, where he lived until the death. He grew up with his twin sister Nada and his older brother Zoran. Since he was a young child, his talent and love for football was obvious. His desire and passion for football, made him spend day and night on the field.

Nenad graduated from Gymnasium XIII in Belgrade, Serbia.

Family
Nenad had a twin sister, Nada, and older brother, Zoran. Nenad's godfather was Cypriot footballer Vesko Mihajlović. Nenad married Snežana in 1991. He left behind two little children, at the time of his death, an eight-month-old Aleksandar, and a two-year-old Katarina.

Nenad joined Tacoma Stars in the United States, but returned later, to open a food processing Family business shop in Banovo brdo, Belgrade, in the immediate vicinity of FK Čukarički stadium. The shop still exists, renamed, NENAD.

Death
First NATO planes flew toward Yugoslavia on 24 March 1999. Nenad, was a reservist in MUP Serbia, and assigned to guard the headquarters on Knez Miloša street. A month after the bombing had started, a bomb was dropped at the headquarters, while Nenad was covering the nightshift, causing damages to the building and its surrounding area. Nenad was not injured, but while he was trying to evacuate the injured people, a second bomb was dropped, and he was killed.

Legacy

Nenad Neša Nikolić Memorial Tournament

Nenad Neša Nikolić Memorial Tournament took place on FK Čukarički football field in 2014, and is held annually since then, to commemorate him. The tournament is supported by the Municipality of Čukarica.

Honors and awards
 The Ministries of Foreign Affairs has a memorial in his name
 Posthumously awarded the Order of Merit in the field of defense and security

References

External links
 Serbia's heroes memorial website page
 MISL profile

1961 births
1999 deaths
Kosovo Serbs
Footballers from Belgrade
Serbian footballers
Serbian military personnel of the Kosovo War
Twin sportspeople
Association football defenders
FK Čukarički players
FK Proleter Zrenjanin players
Yugoslav First League players
Tacoma Stars players
Major Indoor Soccer League (1978–1992) players
Military personnel killed in the Kosovo War
People killed during the NATO bombing of Yugoslavia